The Notting Hill Academy of Music is a vocational music business school located in Notting Hill, London, United Kingdom.  Notting Hill Academy of Music offers courses for individuals interested in pursuing a career in the music industry, with courses focusing on A&R Songwriting and Music Business Entrepreneurship. The academy is backed by the likes of Trevor Nelson, BPI, SONY Music, Warner Music, SJM Concerts and Method Management.

The academy was founded by Relentless Records MD, Shabs Jobanputra and former Senior Manager at BMG, Universal and Ministry of Sound, Ewan Grant in 2015.[4] Since the launch of the Notting Hill Academy of Music, figures in the music industry have come to the Notting Hill Academy of Music to provide seminars and professional insight into the current music industry. Past guests have included Head of Radio at Atlantic Records, Phil Youngman, Outreach Manager for PRS, Andy Ellis, ATC Management's Neil Simpson and many others.

Students are presented with knowledge from lecturers including artist and producer signed to Ultra Music and Founder of A&C Media, Tom Hollings, Alan Boyd who specialises in songwriting, sync licensing, film & TV music and musician, producer and songwriter, Pete Gofton.

Partners & Supporters include: The Ultimate Seminar, CMU, Beggars Group, Ferocious Talent, Relentless Records, Columbia, BMG, First Access Entertainment, ATC Management, Harry Shotta, First & Last, Sentric Music, Disturbing London, Atlantic, The Sound Collective, Influence Digital and many more.

Past guests have included: David Bloomfield, Kid Massive, Drew Lam, Josh Edwards, Trevor Nelson, Simon Barnabas, Andy Ellis, Jamie Croz, Chris Cooke, Tony Moss, Ben Coates, Jack Guppy, Dumi Oburota, Kevin Brown, Shaun Falkner, Nick Halkes, Twin B, Kelli Ali, Neil Simpson, Adele White, Philip Youngman, Kwame Kwaten, Ryan Walter, Harry Shotta, Sam Potts, Alan Boyd and many more.

Courses 
The academy develops short-term music courses (validated and non-validated) to prepare students for work within the evolving music industry.

The academy has courses on A&R and Artist Management, Songwriting, A&R and Songwriting and Music Business Entrepreneur.

Music Business Entrepreneur:

The MBE course is designed to engage those who wish to start their own business and become effective in communicating ideas and plans in a meaningful way. There will be in depth focus on setting up events and creating business plans and marketing plans. No stone is left unturned in regards to the ins and outs of the business side of the music industry.

A&R and Artist Management:

The role of an A&R person has changed dramatically over the years. This course will look to examine all of the key areas that make an effective industry professional in this competitive and exciting sector. An A&R person’s role is to understand most other roles and glue them together in order for the signee to have the best chance of success.
Artist Management is one of the key areas of the music industry and this subject will give students a full understanding of what it takes to be an artist manager in today’s modern music industry.

A&R and Songwriting:

These roles are very different but are also linked very strongly. A songwriter may wish to understand A&R and A&R as well as what is expected of them and vice versa. This module is designed to give the best of both worlds from the two very different perspectives that rely on each other.

Songwriting:

The NHAM songwriting course is geared towards the writer behind the artist or the artist themselves and will explore a multitude of themes. Writing for other people is also key for those who wish to have longevity in this career path. An ability to filter content accordingly is also an important skill to have and integral elements such as this will be analysed.

References

Music schools in London
Education in the Royal Borough of Kensington and Chelsea
Business schools in England